Slate Creek Records is an American independent record label based in Frisco, Texas  founded in 2012 by Jim Burnett.  The label's President is longtime Nashville producer Garth Fundis, who has worked with many artists including Don Williams, Trisha Yearwood, Keith Whitley and Sugarland.
The first release on the label was "Pride" by Neal McCoy. Pride: A Tribute to Charley Pride was a tribute album to artist Charley Pride which featured guest performances by Darius Rucker and Trace Adkins.

October 2013 saw the debut album release of Nashville songwriter Brandy Clark.  Clark wrote or co-wrote all 12 of the songs and it features Vince Gill on background vocals. Prior to releasing 12 Stories, Clark had written/cowritten several hits for other artists including "Mama's Broken Heart" for Miranda Lambert,"Better Dig Two" for The Band Perry and "Follow Your Arrow" for Kacey Musgraves.
In May 2014 Slate Creek announced the signing of Pistol Annies member, Angaleena Presley to the label. Her debut album is set to be released in October 2014.  One month later, Canadian group, The Bros. Landreth announced that their debut album would be released on Slate Creek on January 27, 2015.

On February 6, 2017, it was announced that a tribute album honoring Don Williams would be released on May 26, 2017.  The 11-track album includes performers and songwriters such as Pistol Annies, Garth Brooks, Chris Stapleton, Jason Isbell, Dierks Bentley, Keb' Mo', Alison Krauss, Lady Antebellum, Brandy Clark, Trisha Yearwood and John Prine.

Artists

Former artists 
 Brandy Clark
 Neal McCoy
 The Bros. Landreth
 Angaleena Presley

Studio albums 
 2013: Neal McCoy- Pride: A Tribute to Charley Pride 2013: Brandy Clark-12 Stories
 2014: Angaleena Presley- American Middle Class
 2014:  Neal McCoy- Pride: A Tribute to Charley Pride-Deluxe Edition (Cracker Barrel)
 2015: The Bros Landreth- Let it Lie
 2017:  Gentle Giants- The songs of Don Williams

Awards and nominations

See also 
 List of record labels
 2012 in music

References 

American country music record labels
American independent record labels
2012 establishments in Texas
Record labels established in 2012